Majubooru Loabi (English: forced love) is a 2000 Maldivian comedy drama film directed by Amjad Ibrahim. Produced by Shiham Rasheed under Motion Pictures, the film stars Yoosuf Shafeeu, Reeko Moosa Manik and Mariyam Nisha in pivotal roles.

Premise
Aisthu (Arifa Ibrahim) and Chilhiya Moosa Manik arrange their emotionally immature daughter's marriage with a successful young man, Naushad (Yoosuf Shafeeu). A heated argument arises between Shifna (Mariyam Nisha) and her father when she refuses to accept their proposal, which results in her father having a heart attack. Ultimately Shifna marries Naushad and they share uncomfortable moments together while learning their personalities. Meanwhile, Shifna has a secret affair with a goon, Shafiu (Reeko Moosa Manik) whom she tries to reform.

Cast 
 Yoosuf Shafeeu as Naushad
 Reeko Moosa Manik as Shafiu
 Mariyam Nisha as Shifna
 Ismail Hilmy
 Mariyam Rizla
 Chilhiya Moosa Manik as Shifna's father
 Arifa Ibrahim as Aisthu
 Sithi Fulhu as Sheela
 Haajara Abdul Kareem as Sheetha
 Mohamed Abdulla as Giritee
 Mariyam Ismail
 Shaufa Shiyam
 Liraaru Ahmed

Soundtrack

References

2000 films
Maldivian comedy-drama films
Films directed by Amjad Ibrahim
2000 comedy-drama films
Dhivehi-language films